Dispur Assembly constituency is one of the 126 assembly constituencies of  Assam a north east state of India. Dispur is also capital of Assam. As per Election Indian website, there are 354 polling booths in Dispur Assembly constituency.

Members of Legislative Assembly

 1978: Tarini Mohan Barua, Janata Party.
 1983: Tarini Mohan Barua, Indian National Congress.
 1985: Atul Bora, Independent
 1991: Atul Bora, Asom Gana Parishad
 1996: Atul Bora, Asom Gana Parishad
 2001: Robin Bordoloi, Indian National Congress
 2006: Akon Bora, Indian National Congress
 2011: Akon Bora, Indian National Congress
 2016: Atul Bora, Bharatiya Janata Party
 2021: Atul Bora, Bharatiya Janata Party

Election results

See also
 Dispur
 List of constituencies of Assam Legislative Assembly

References

External links 
 

Assembly constituencies of Assam